Asthore is a 1917 British silent film directed by Wilfred Noy.

Cast
 Hayford Hobbs as Lord Frederick Armitage 
 Violet Marriott as Elsa

References
Citations

Bibliography

External links
 

1917 films
1917 drama films
British drama films
Films directed by Wilfred Noy
British silent feature films
British black-and-white films
1910s English-language films
1910s British films
Silent drama films